Naniz-e Sofla (also Romanized as Nanīz-e Soflá and Nanīz Soflá; also known as Nanīz, Nanīz-e Pā’īn, and Nanūke-e Pā’īn) is a village in Siyah Banuiyeh Rural District, in the Central District of Rabor County, Kerman Province, Iran. At the 2006 census, its population was 155, in 43 families.

References 

Populated places in Rabor County